Bradford Newcomb Stevens (January 3, 1813 – November 10, 1885) was a U.S. Representative from Illinois.

Born in Boscawen, New Hampshire, Stevens attended schools in New Hampshire and at Montreal, Quebec, Canada, and graduated from Dartmouth College, Hanover, New Hampshire, in 1835. He taught school six years in Hopkinsville, Kentucky, and New York City. He moved to Bureau County, Illinois, in 1846, where he engaged in mercantile and agricultural pursuits, and also worked as county surveyor. He served as mayor of Tiskilwa, Illinois.

Stevens was elected as a Democrat to the Forty-second Congress (March 4, 1871 – March 3, 1873). He resumed mercantile and agricultural pursuits. He died in Tiskilwa, Illinois, on November 10, 1885. He was interred in Mount Bloom Cemetery.

References

1813 births
1885 deaths
Dartmouth College alumni
People from Boscawen, New Hampshire
People from Bureau County, Illinois
Mayors of places in Illinois
American surveyors
Democratic Party members of the United States House of Representatives from Illinois
19th-century American politicians